Ahmad Moallahyidi Abubakar  (born 5 September 1957) is a Senator of the Federal Republic of Nigeria from Adamawa State. He represents Adamawa south in the current 8th National Assembly. Senator Nyako is the vice-chairman, Culture and Tourism Committee and also Gas Committee of the 8th National Assembly.

Nyako was elected as a senator into the 8th National Assembly under the All Progressives Congress (APC).

Adamawa south Senatorial District covers seven local government areas.

Early life
Abubakar started his primary education at Ganye 1 Primary School Ganye and completed it in 1975 before proceeding to North East College of Agricultural Science in Maiduguri and later proceeded to Ahmadu Bello University for both his Bachelors and master's degrees.

Political career
Abubakar, won the 2015 Adamawa South Senatorial polls on the platform of the All Progressives Congress to emerge as the senator of the district.

References

1957 births
Living people
Members of the Senate (Nigeria)
Nigerian Muslims
People from Adamawa State
Politicians from Adamawa state
Adamawa State politicians
Ahmadu Bello University alumni